Full name: François Simond.

Gender: Male.

Height:  183 cm (6 ft 0 in).

Weight: 87 kg (192 lb).

Born: 27 September 1969 in Grenoble, Isère, France.

Affiliations: Skiclub Douanes, Haute Savoie.

Country: FRA France.

Sport: Alpine Skiing .

François Simond (born 27 September 1969) is a French former alpine skier who competed in the 1992 Winter Olympics and 1998 Winter Olympics.

External links
 

1969 births
Living people
French male alpine skiers
Olympic alpine skiers of France
Alpine skiers at the 1992 Winter Olympics
Alpine skiers at the 1998 Winter Olympics
Universiade medalists in alpine skiing
Universiade silver medalists for France
Competitors at the 1993 Winter Universiade